Robert E. Hall (born May 31, 1947) is a retired United States Army soldier who served as the eleventh Sergeant Major of the Army from October 21, 1997, to June 23, 2000.

Early life and education
Hall was born in Gaffney, South Carolina, on May 31, 1947. He entered the United States Army in February 1968 and attended Basic Training at Fort Bragg, North Carolina, and Advanced Individual Training at Fort Bliss, Texas. He holds a Bachelor of Arts degree in management from Park College in Parkville, Missouri.

Military career
Throughout his 32-year career, Hall held every key leadership position including: squad leader, 2nd Infantry Division, Korea; platoon sergeant, battalion operations sergeant and battalion intelligence sergeant, 1st Armored Division, Germany; first sergeant, B Battery, 2nd Battalion, 59th Air Defense Artillery, Germany; and drill sergeant, Fort Bliss, Texas. His military education includes Drill Sergeant School, Advanced Noncommissioned Officers Course, First Sergeants Course, and the Sergeants Major Academy, where he served as an instructor upon graduation from class 26. He also served on the staff of the United States Army Training and Doctrine Command, Fort Monroe, Virginia. His experience and expertise distinguished him as the 1979 Army Drill Sergeant of the Year and selection and induction into the prestigious Sergeant Morales Club and the Sergeant Audie Murphy Club.

Hall held a variety of senior non-commissioned officer positions culminating in his assignment as the Sergeant Major of the Army. He previously held the senior enlisted position as command sergeant major of the United States Central Command, MacDill Air Force Base, Florida. Other assignments he held as command sergeant major were: the 1st Battalion, 5th Air Defense Artillery, Fort Stewart, Georgia; Commandant, 24th Infantry Division Non-commissioned Officer Academy, Fort Stewart; and the 24th Division Artillery, Saudi Arabia and Iraq; the 2nd Infantry Division, Korea; and First United States Army, Fort Meade, Maryland.

Personal life
In retirement, Hall continues to serve the military community and has received numerous awards to include the Outstanding Civilian Service Award. In 2007, he was presented the Doughboy Award for his outstanding contributions to the US Army Infantry.

Awards and decorations

10 Service stripes.

References

The Sergeants Major of the Army,  Daniel K. Elder, Center of Military History, United States Army Washington, D.C. 2003.

1947 births
Living people
People from Gaffney, South Carolina
Recipients of the Distinguished Service Medal (US Army)
Recipients of the Legion of Merit
Park University alumni
Recipients of the Defense Superior Service Medal
Sergeants Major of the Army
Recipients of the Defense Distinguished Service Medal